The Ranken Dart was an anti-Zeppelin weapon developed during the First World War.

It was developed for use against German Zeppelin airships by Engineer Lieutenant Commander Francis Ranken, initially as a Royal Naval Air Service weapon but was also adopted by the Royal Flying Corps in 1916.

Usually carried in packs of 24; the darts could be dropped individually or all at once. Aircraft equipped with Ranken darts had to climb above their targets,  before dropping them. Ranken Darts became obsolete with the advent of the combination of explosive Pomeroy bullets and incendiary ammunition fired from .303 Vickers and Lewis guns mounted on fighter aircraft.

Design
The Ranken dart consisted of a tinplate tube 23cm long, with a cast iron pointed nose at one end, and a plug and three spring loaded arms at the other. The arms were kept closed in storage by means of a cap, either tin or rubber, which acted as a buffer when the dart was in its dropping tube. When released, the arms opened up and locked in place to act as a grapnel, thus ensuring that the body entered the fabric. The Dart contained high explosive, black powder and phosphorus which were ignited when the head penetrated the airship's outer skin.

References

Further reading

External links
Sectioned Ranken Dart in the Imperial War Museum collection

Aerial bombs of the United Kingdom
Incendiary weapons
World War I weapons of the United Kingdom
Anti-aircraft weapons